Confidential Assignment 2: International is a 2022 South Korean action comedy film directed by Lee Seok-hoon. It serves as the sequel to the 2017 film Confidential Assignment. The film stars Hyun Bin, Yoo Hae-jin, Im Yoon-ah, Daniel Henney, and Jin Seon-kyu. The film was released on September 7, 2022.

Plot 
In New York City, Jang Myong-jun, who is the leader of a North Korean terrorist organization, is about to be transferred to Pyongyang when the FBI officials are attacked by North Korean gangsters and Myong-jun escapes. Myong-jun sneaks into Seoul using a fake passport and also took 1 billion with the help of his partner Kim Chul-soo, a former agent and scientist. Learning this, the North Korean government sends Im Cheol-ryong to Seoul again to catch him and retrieve the money. 

Cheol-ryeong reunites with Kang Jin-tae and they resume the investigation to trail Myong-jun, but the duo is interrupted by an FBI agent named Jack, who wishes to bring the North Korean criminals back to U.S. on charges of killing FBI officials. They agree to work together, and the operation is expanded to a trilateral collaboration of the Koreans and Americans. At the hotel, Cheol-ryeong confesses that Myong-jun is his senior and a former North Korean agent. Jack also tells that he received mail from Adolf Bohrmann to catch Myong-jun 2 months ago, and he suspected that Bohrmann's boss Michael Joe, a crime boss, is helping Myong-jun in money laundering, and Joe had betrayed Myong-jun to steal the money. 

The next morning, the trio decide to track Sergey, the person who provides a fake passport and illegal cell phones to Myong-jun, and they follow his girlfriend Natasha, a Russian model. At night, Natasha goes out for shopping, where Jin-tae sneaks into her house to implant a bug, but is attacked by Sergey. However, Jin-tae manages to defeat Sergey and brings him to the interrogation room, where they track the cell phone's location to Joe's club. The trio, along with Jin-tae's sister-in-law Park Min-young, infiltrate the club. Myong-jun meets Joe at the penthouse and demands him to hand over the money. When Joe refuses, Myong-jun kills him and Chul-soo, as the latter is in cahoots with the FBI. 

Cheol-ryeong heads to the penthouse where he manages to arrest Myong-jun. Later at the North Korean delegation's residence, Cheol-ryeong finds that Bohrmann is actually a German scientist, who is responsible for killing Jews in a gas leak accident. Cheol-ryeong informs this to Jack, who later learns that his boss is also in cahoots with Myong-jun. An assassin tries to kill Jack, but he manages to subdue him and learns that Jin-tae's family are being held by Myong-jun and Jin-tae is forced to take Myong-jun's henchman into the residence to spread a virus on the residence's radio tower. 

Myong-jun frees himself and kills his former superior Kim Jeong-teak, who is actually Bohrmann, and is revealed to have hired Myeong-jun to steal the money. Jeong-teak is also the person responsible for the death of Myong-jun's family. Jack reaches Jin-tae's house and kills the attackers, thus saving the family. Cheol-ryeong and Jin-tae arrive and the two manage to defuse the virus bomb and kill Myong-jun. After this, the money is delivered to UNICEF, and Cheol-ryeong proposes to Min-young before returning to North Korea.

Cast
 Hyun Bin as Im Cheol-ryung, a detective from North Korea's special investigation team
 Yoo Hae-jin as Kang Jin-tae, a detective from South Korea and father of Kang Yeon-ah
 Im Yoon-ah as Park Min-young, sister-in-law of Kang Jin-tae
 Daniel Henney as Jack, an FBI agent
 Jin Seon-kyu as Jang Myung-jun, the leader of a North Korean criminal organization
 Jang Young-nam as Park So-yeon, wife of Kang Jin-tae
 Park Min-ha as Kang Yeon-ah, daughter of Kang Jin-tae
 Park Hyung-soo as an NIS agent
 Lee Min-ji as an NIS agent
 Park Hoon as Park Sang-wi, a member of a global organized crime syndicate.
 Lee Je-yeon as Oh Jong-goo, a cyber detective
 Jeon Bae-soo as Kim Jung-taek
 Kim Won-hae as Sergey
 Lim Seong-jae as Kim Sang-sa
 Lee Seung-hoon as Oh Deok, a cyber detective

Production

Casting
On August 24, 2020, Hyun Bin and Yoo Hae-jin was reported to be in discussion to reprise their role as Im Cheol-ryung and Kang Jin-tae, respectively. On August 26, 2020, Daniel Henney was reported to be in discussion to join the cast. On August 28, 2020, Im Yoon-ah was reported to be in discussion to reprise her role as Park Min-young.

On January 22, 2021, Hyun Bin, Yoo Hae-jin, and Im Yoon-ah was confirmed to reprise their role. In addition, Daniel Henney and Jin Seon-kyu joined the cast.

On February 13, 2021, the script reading took place. On February 16, 2021, Park Min-ha was confirmed to reprise her role as Kang Yeon-ah, making it her first acting project in 5 years after its prequel. On February 19, 2021, Park Hyung-soo joined the cast. On February 26, 2021, Lee Min-ji joined the cast.

Filming

Reception

Box office
The film was released on 2167 screens on September 7, 2022, in South Korea. The film surpassed 1 million admissions in 3 days of release and 2 million admissions in 5 days of release, achieving the milestone at twice the speed of its predecessor. On September 12, six days after its release, it became the fourth South Korean film in 2022 to cross 3 million admissions. On September 22, 16 days after its release, it became the third South Korean film in 2022 to cross 5 million admissions. On October 2, 26 days after its release, it surpassed 6 million admissions.

, it is the third highest-grossing Korean film of 2022, with a gross of US$56,282,820, and 6,982,840 admissions.

Awards and nominations

References

External links
 
 

2020s Korean-language films
South Korean action comedy films
South Korean police films
South Korean sequel films
Films about the Federal Bureau of Investigation
Films about North Korea–South Korea relations
Films set in New York City
Films set in Pyongyang
Films set in Seoul
Films set in 2022
CJ Entertainment films